The canton of Ydes is an administrative division of the Cantal department, southern France. It was created at the French canton reorganisation which came into effect in March 2015. Its seat is in Ydes.

It consists of the following communes:
 
Antignac
Arches
Bassignac
Beaulieu
Champagnac
Champs-sur-Tarentaine-Marchal
Jaleyrac
Lanobre
Madic
La Monselie
Le Monteil
Saignes
Saint-Pierre
Sauvat
Sourniac
Trémouille
Vebret
Veyrières
Ydes

References

Cantons of Cantal